Antonio Gorostegui Ceballos (born 1 April 1954) is a Spanish competitive sailor and Olympic silver medalist.

He won a silver medal in the 470 class at the 1976 Summer Olympics in Montreal, along with his partner Pedro Millet.
He also won the 1982 and 1983 Star class World Championship together with Jose Doreste.

He was involved with Desafio España Copa Americ at the 1992 Louis Vuitton Cup.

References

1954 births
Living people
Spanish male sailors (sport)
Sailors (sport) from Cantabria
Olympic medalists in sailing
Olympic sailors of Spain
Olympic silver medalists for Spain
Sailors at the 1976 Summer Olympics – 470
Sailors at the 1980 Summer Olympics – Star
Sailors at the 1984 Summer Olympics – Star
Sailors at the 1988 Summer Olympics – Soling
Star class world champions
Sportspeople from Santander, Spain
World champions in sailing for Spain
470 class world champions

Medalists at the 1976 Summer Olympics
1992 America's Cup sailors
20th-century Spanish people